Imran Butt (born 27 December 1995) is a Pakistani cricketer who plays for Balochistan. He made his debut for the Pakistan cricket team in January 2021.

Career
In September 2019, he was named in Balochistan's squad for the 2019–20 Quaid-e-Azam Trophy tournament. He was the leading run-scorer in the tournament, with 934 runs in nine matches.

In June 2020, he was named as one of four reserve players for Pakistan's tour to England during the COVID-19 pandemic. In November 2020, he was named in Pakistan's 35-man squad for their tour to New Zealand. In December 2020, he was named in Pakistan's Test side for the first match against New Zealand. In January 2021, he was also named in Pakistan's Test squad for their series against South Africa. He made his Test debut for Pakistan, against South Africa, on 26 January 2021.

References

External links
 

1995 births
Living people
Pakistani cricketers
Pakistan Test cricketers
Badureliya Sports Club cricketers
Khyber Pakhtunkhwa cricketers
Lahore cricketers
Lahore Qalandars cricketers
North West Warriors cricketers
Sui Northern Gas Pipelines Limited cricketers
Cricketers from Lahore
People from Lahore